The 2018 United States House of Representatives elections in South Carolina were held on November 6, 2018, to elect the seven U.S. representatives from the state of South Carolina, one from each of the state's seven congressional districts. The elections coincided with a gubernatorial election, as well as other elections to the House of Representatives, elections to the United States Senate and various state and local elections. 

This was the first time that the Democrats picked up a seat in South Carolina since 1986. The state congressional delegation changed from 6–1 for Republicans to 5–2 for Republicans. Prior to this, the last time the Democrats had held 2 seats in the state had been in 2010.

Results summary

Statewide

District
Results of the 2018 United States House of Representatives elections in South Carolina by district:

District 1

The 1st district is located in the Low Country, on the Atlantic coastal plain from Hilton Head to the border of Georgetown County, it includes most of the Charleston area. The incumbent was Republican Mark Sanford, who had represented the district since 2013. Sanford was defeated by Republican Katie Arrington in the primary. Arrington went on to lose the general election to Democrat 
Joe Cunningham.

Democratic primary

Results

Republican primary
Sanford defeated State Representative Jenny Horne in the 2016 primary by only a 56-44 percent margin.  The closer than expected result led to speculation that Sanford could be vulnerable to another primary challenge in 2018. Former Director of the South Carolina Department of Health and Environmental Control Catherine Templeton was reportedly being recruited to challenge Sanford, but decided instead to run for governor.

Polling

Results

Endorsements

General election

Predictions

Debates
Complete video of debate, October 16, 2018

Polling

Results

District 2

The 2nd district is located in central South Carolina and spans from Columbia to the South Carolina side of the Augusta, Georgia metropolitan area. The incumbent was Republican Joe Wilson, who had represented the district since 2001.  Wilson was re-elected with 60% of the vote in 2016 and ran unopposed in the Republican Primary.

Democratic primary

Results

Runoff results

General election

Results

District 3

The 3rd district is located in northwestern South Carolina. The incumbent was Republican Jeff Duncan, who had represented the district since 2011. Duncan was re-elected with 73% of the vote in 2016.

Democratic primary

Results

General election

Results

District 4

The 4th district is located in Upstate South Carolina. The incumbent was Republican Trey Gowdy, who had represented the district since 2011. Gowdy was re-elected with 67% of the vote in 2016. 
Gowdy announced in January 2018 that he would not run for re-election in 2018.

Democratic primary

Results

Runoff results

Republican primary

Results

Runoff results

General election

Results

District 5

The 5th district is located in northern South Carolina. The incumbent was Republican Ralph Norman, who had represented the district since 2017. Norman was elected with 51% of the vote in a 2017 special election to replace Mick Mulvaney. Norman's challenger in the special election, Archie Parnell, announced on the 9th of October that he would seek the Democratic nomination for the 2018 election for District 5. The primaries were held on June 12, 2018. Incumbent Ralph Norman was unopposed for the Republican nomination.

Democratic primary
Special election candidate and former Goldman Sachs employee Parnell had the most fundraising of the four Democratic candidates as of June 9. He was opposed by former York County Councilwoman Sidney Moore, professional clown Steven Lough, and Mark Ali, a former undocumented immigrant. Parnell's campaign was overshadowed by the resignation of many of his campaign staff after the discovery of allegations of domestic violence committed by him in 1973. However, he refused to drop out of the race, and won the primary with 60% of the vote.

Results

General election

Results

District 6

The 6th district is located in central and southern South Carolina. The incumbent was Democrat Jim Clyburn, who had represented the district since 1993. Clyburn was re-elected with 70% of the vote in 2016.

General election

Results

District 7

The 7th district is located in northeastern South Carolina. The incumbent was Republican Tom Rice, who had represented the district since 2013. Rice was re-elected with 61% of the vote in 2016.

Democratic primary

Results

Runoff results

Republican primary

Results

General election

Results

References

External links
Candidates at Vote Smart 
Candidates at Ballotpedia 
Campaign finance at FEC 
Campaign finance at OpenSecrets

Official campaign websites of first district candidates
Katie Arrington (R) for Congress
Joe Cunningham (D) for Congress

Official campaign websites of second district candidates
Sean Carrigan (D) for Congress
Joe Wilson (R) for Congress

Official campaign websites of third district candidates
Jeff Duncan (R) for Congress
Mary Geren (D) for Congress

Official campaign websites of fourth district candidates
Brandon Brown (D) for Congress
William Timmons (R) for Congress

Official campaign websites of fifth district candidates
Ralph Norman (R) for Congress
Archie Parnell (D) for Congress

Official campaign websites of sixth district candidates
Jim Clyburn (D) for Congress
Gerhard Gressmann (R) for Congress

Official campaign websites of seventh district candidates
Tom Rice (R) for Congress

2018
South Carolina
United States House of Representatives